"We May Never Pass This Way (Again)" is a song by American soft rock duo Seals and Crofts, released as a single in 1973. It was the second single from their fifth studio album, Diamond Girl. The song reached No. 21 on the US Billboard Hot 100 and spent two weeks at number 18 on the Cash Box Top 100.

The song was a significantly greater hit on the Adult Contemporary chart, where it reached number two on both the American and Canadian charts.

Chart performance

References

External links
  

1973 singles
Seals and Crofts songs
Songs written by James Seals
1973 songs
Warner Records singles